Romulea ramiflora is a species of plant in the family Iridaceae.

Sources

References 

ramiflora
Flora of Malta